was one of the three sons of Kanō Jigorō, the creator of Judo. Risei Kanō was the second president of the International Judo Federation, from 1952 to 1965.  He managed the Kōdōkan from 1946 until 1980, when he was succeeded by Yukimitsu Kano.

References

1900 births
1986 deaths
Japanese male judoka
20th-century Japanese people